Brandon Michael Kirsch (born October 13, 1983) is a former American football quarterback. He played college football at Purdue University, where he would forgo his senior season to enter the 2006 NFL Draft. Kirsh played for the Colorado Crush and Philadelphia Soul of the Arena Football League (AFL).

Early life
Kirsch, attended Cedar Crest High School in Lebanon, Pennsylvania, where he was first team all-state, first team all-county and league Most Valuable Player as senior after completing 115 of 198 passes (58.0 percent) for 1,950 yards and 26 touchdowns. He also rushed for 515 yards on 88 carries (5.9 average) and two touchdowns. Brandon was named second team all-county both his sophomore and junior seasons and was honorable mention all-state as junior. He completed 104 of 186 passes (55.9 percent) for 1,595 yards and 20 touchdowns as junior and 78 of 162 passes (48.1 percent) for 1,178 yards and 14 touchdowns as sophomore. Career totals were 300 of 552 passing (54.3 percent) for 4,808 yards and 61 touchdowns with 241 rushes for 1,142 yards (4.7 average) and 10 touchdowns. His high school football coach was Gene Fuhrman. He also played baseball and basketball. On September 24, 2001, he signed a letter of intent to play quarterback at Purdue University. He was ranked a 4-star prospect according to Rivals.com.

College career
Kirsch started four games in 2002 as a true freshman, completing 59.0 percent of his passes for 1,067 yards with 8 touchdowns and 5 interceptions. He was also third on the team in rushing with 423 yards. Kirsch appeared in only three games his sophomore season (all as a reserve) before injuring his throwing shoulder and taking a medical redshirt. He returned in 2005 and started six games, throwing for 1,625 yards with 7 touchdowns and 7 interceptions in those games, before being benched in favor of freshman Curtis Painter. Following the benching, Kirsch caused a controversy on the team and lost popularity among fans and teammates. Kirsch chose to not return to school for his senior season, declaring himself for the 2006 NFL Draft.

Statistics
Kirsch's career stats are as follows:

Professional career
Kirsch was rated the 21st quarterback in the 2006 NFL Draft by NFLDraftScout.com.

Colorado Crush
He was not drafted by the NFL and signed with the Arena Football League's Colorado Crush. Spent two seasons with the Crush, (2007–08) where he played four total games, completing 12-of-21 passes for 179 yards and 2 touchdowns.

Philadelphia Soul
On May 20, 2011, the Philadelphia Soul signed Kirsch to fill in for Justin Allgood, who was traded to the Tulsa Talons. On June 19, 2011, it was announced that he would start in place of the struggling Ryan Vena.

Reading Express
Kirsch signed with the Reading Express of the Indoor Football League (IFL) for the 2012 season, but never played for the Express.

Statistics

Stats from ArenaFan:

References

External links
 Purdue profile

1983 births
Living people
American football quarterbacks
Colorado Crush players
Philadelphia Soul players
Purdue Boilermakers football players
People from Lebanon, Pennsylvania
Players of American football from Pennsylvania
Reading Express players